Finneytown Local School District is a school district headquartered at the Finneytown Secondary Campus in Finneytown, Springfield Township, Hamilton County, Ohio, in the Cincinnati metropolitan area.

Schools:
 Finneytown Secondary Campus
 Brent Elementary School
 Whitaker Elementary School

References

External links
 

School districts in Ohio